The following are the national records in Olympic weightlifting in Romania. Records are maintained in each weight class for the snatch lift, clean and jerk lift, and the total for both lifts by the Federația Română de Haltere.

Current records

Men

Women

References

External links

Romania
Records
Olympic weightlifting
weightlifting